Robin Hanzl (born 10 January 1989) is a Czech professional ice hockey forward. He is currently playing for Timrå IK in the Swedish Hockey League (SHL).

Playing career
He made his professional debut in his native Czech Republic, playing with HC Litvínov in the Czech Extraliga during the 2010–11 Czech Extraliga season.

Hanzl left the Czech Extraliga after seven seasons and played his first season abroad in the KHL with HC Neftekhimik Nizhnekamsk in 2017–18. Hanzl left Nizhnekamsk after just one year opting to continue in the KHL in agreeing to terms on a one-year contract with his second Russian club, HC Spartak Moscow, on May 3, 2018.

Hanzl remained with Spartak Moscow for three seasons, totalling 89 points in 167 games before leaving as a free agent following the 2020–21 season. On 18 June 2021, Hanzl moved to the SHL, joining newly promoted club, Timrå IK, on a one-year contract.

Career statistics

International

References

External links

1989 births
Czech ice hockey forwards
HC Litvínov players
Living people
HC Neftekhimik Nizhnekamsk players
HC Spartak Moscow players
Sportspeople from Ústí nad Labem
Timrå IK players
Czech expatriate ice hockey players in Russia
Czech expatriate ice hockey players in Sweden
HC Slovan Ústečtí Lvi players